The Hunt in the Forest (also known as The Hunt by Night or simply The Hunt) is a painting by the Italian artist Paolo Uccello, made around 1470. It is perhaps the best-known painting in the Ashmolean Museum, Oxford, England.

The painting is an early example of the effective use of perspective in Renaissance art, with the hunt participants, including people, horses, dogs and deer, disappearing into the dark forest in the distance. It was Uccello's last known painting before his death in 1475.

In popular culture 
The painting is featured in the "Point of Vanishing" episode of the British TV series Lewis. A postcard of the painting is discovered as a clue to a murder. Lewis and his colleague visit the painting at the Ashmolean Museum on more than one occasion and are instructed on its significant features by a museum expert. The painting provides Lewis with an insight that allows him to solve the case.

John Fowles mentions the painting twice, in The Ebony Tower and The Collector: "...the design hits you the moment you see it.  Apart from all the other technical things.  You know it's faultless."

References

External links 
Entry in the Web Gallery of Art
Painting and poem

1470s paintings
Paintings by Paolo Uccello
Paintings in the collection of the Ashmolean Museum
Horses in art
Deer in art
Dogs in art
Hunting in art